The RHS Chelsea Flower Show, formally known as the Great Spring Show, is a garden show held for five days in May by the Royal Horticultural Society (RHS) in the grounds of the Royal Hospital Chelsea in Chelsea, London. Held at Chelsea since 1912, the show is attended by members of the British Royal Family.

Highlights to the Chelsea Flower Show include the avant-garde show gardens designed by leading names with Floral Marquee at the centrepiece. The Show also features smaller gardens such as the Artisan and Urban Gardens.

History

Great Spring Show
The first Royal Horticultural Society Great Spring Show was held in 1862, at the RHS garden in Kensington. Before this date the RHS had held flower shows from 1833 in their garden in Chiswick, which themselves had been preceded by fetes. The Kensington Garden was chosen as a site because the flower shows in Chiswick were experiencing falling visitor numbers due to problems such as poor transport links. The Great Spring Show was held at Kensington for twenty-six years but in 1888 the RHS decided to move the show to the heart of London. The site chosen was the Temple Gardens, situated between the Embankment and Fleet Street, which had a recorded history dating back to 1307 and which were said to date from the time of the Knights Templar. The roses for which these Temple Gardens were famous were alluded to in Shakespeare's Henry VI Part 1. Using two marquees requisitioned from the old Kensington shows, the 1888 show was a success with exhibits from both amateurs and commercial firms. By 1897 five marquees were being used with many of the best known plant and seed merchants being attracted to the event including Suttons and Sons.

Royal International Horticultural Exhibition
In 1912, the Temple Show was cancelled to make way for the Royal International Horticultural Exhibition. Sir Harry Veitch, the great nurseryman, secured the grounds of the Royal Hospital, Chelsea for this one-off event. It proved such a good site for an exhibition that the Great Spring Show was moved there in 1913, where it has taken place almost every year since.

Royal Hospital, Chelsea – early 20th century
The RHS first became involved with the Chelsea Hospital in 1905. Three years before, it had leased the grounds of Holland House in Kensington to hold what was first advertised as a Coronation Rose Show, but which turned into a more general show (with not many roses) by the time it actually opened in June.  Two further two-day summer shows took place at Holland House in 1903 and 1904, but then, to the general satisfaction of exhibitors and press, a three-day Summer Show was staged in the Hospital grounds, a more spacious site than Holland House had allowed, with room for five tents.  The Summer Shows reverted to Holland House for the years thereafter, except in 1911, when both it and Chelsea proved unavailable, and the Show was held at the Olympia exhibition hall.

The Royal International Horticultural Exhibition of 1912 demonstrated, at a time when the complaints from the Temple were increasing annually, what an excellent site for a show the grounds of the Chelsea Hospital provided.  Accordingly, for 1913, the Great Spring Show was moved there. The first Chelsea Flower Show opened on May 20. The Summer Show reverted to Holland House.  Despite the First World War, the show was held 1914–1916, but was cancelled in 1917 and 1918.

By the roaring 1920s, the Chelsea Flower Show was back in full swing, the famous Chelsea tea parties were established and Royal visits resumed. In 1926 the show was held a week late due to the General Strike.

In 1937, King George VI and Queen Elizabeth celebrated their Coronation Year, and to mark the occasion, a superb Empire Exhibition was staged. It featured wattles from Australia, pines from Canada, brilliant gladioli from East Africa and even a big prickly pear from Palestine.

The show was cancelled during the Second World War, as the land was required by the War Office for an anti-aircraft site. Some doubt arose as to whether the show would resume in 1947. The majority of exhibitors wanted a postponement, as stocks of plants were low, staff much depleted and fuel for greenhouses was obtainable only with special permits, but Lord Aberconway (then RHS President) and the RHS Council felt strongly that the show should resume as soon as possible. As it turned out, the show went ahead in 1947 and it was a great success.

Royal Hospital, Chelsea – later 20th century
	
The coronation of Queen Elizabeth II in 1953 was a sufficient cause for a flower show that reflected the celebratory mood of the country. Most members of the royal family attended that year. Due to other commitments, the only member of the family unable to attend was the Queen herself.

And the Show went on to increase in popularity throughout the second half of the century – until its popularity became its major problem.  Crowding within the tents had been a recurring refrain during the interwar years, but always mastered by increasing the tentage; photographs show heavy crowds in the open, especially in the vicinity of the rock gardens.  As the 1970s progressed, the attendance at the Chelsea Show climbed, by as much as 6,000 visitors in a single year (1978). In 1979, crowding became so severe in the mornings that the turnstiles were temporarily closed, and it was clear that some emergency action was needed.  It was decided to open the Show at 8 am next year, and close it at 8.30 in the evenings, with a  reduced price for entry after 4 pm, to try to draw people away from the morning time-slot; and a one-way system was laid out in the marquee (an expedient that had been rejected as impracticable 20 years earlier).

The arrangements worked better than expected in 1980, when a bare majority of Council voted for the imposition of a ceiling on the number of tickets sold.  But numbers continued to increase, and in 1987 the turnstiles were closed again.  In 1988 a limit of 40,000 visitors per day was imposed – a reduction of 90,000 in total from the previous year – and members were charged for tickets for the first time.  An immediate response was a fall in attendance; by April, ticket booking was so slow that national advertisements were taken out to encourage people to come to Chelsea, and the original announcement that tickets would not be available at the gates was rescinded.  1988 was also the first year that ticket touts made their presence felt, and the RHS felt the frustration of seeing its tickets sold at a considerable mark-up without being able to do anything.

An alarmed Council now began to look seriously at the idea of moving the show to a larger venue. Battersea Park, Osterley Park, and Wisley were suggested; one proposal was that Chelsea should be limited to plant sales, and the sundries rerouted elsewhere; the firm of Land Use Consultants was hired to prepare a feasibility study, and after examining all these options, concluded that the Show should stay at Chelsea. The real rescue came from the expansion of the shows programme into other venues, and in particular from the takeover of the Hampton Court Palace Flower Show in 1993: the increased options for both members and for exhibitors meant that the intense criticisms and conflict of the 1980s over the future of the Show did not return.

The Chelsea Flower Show today

The Chelsea Flower Show receives a lot of publicity. It is attended by 157,000 visitors each year (a number limited by the capacity of the  ground), and all tickets must be purchased in advance. From 2005 the show was increased from four days to five, with the first two days only open to RHS members. The show is extensively covered on television by the BBC. An official DVD of the show is produced on behalf of the RHS by ONE TWO FOUR. Several members of the British Royal Family attend a preview of the show, as part of the royal patronage of the RHS. The area of land devoted to show gardens increased steadily between 1970 and 2000 and the show has become an important venue for watching trends. New plants are often launched at the show and the popularity of older varieties revived under the focus of the horticultural world. It is the garden design equivalent of a catwalk at a fashion show.

Highlights from the 2011 RHS Chelsea Flower Show included The Irish Sky Garden by Diarmuid Gavin based on the idea of a restaurant in the sky. Other show-stopping gardens included the HESCO Garden by Leeds City Council, who reconstructed an impressive and idyllic working water wheel in the grounds of the Royal Hospital.

The 2011 show also saw the introduction of the new Artisan garden category, which was created for designers who use natural materials.

Awards

There are four grades of award presented – gold, silver-gilt, silver and bronze – in each of the categories listed below. Bronze grade exhibits do not actually receive a medal.

Awards categories
 Flora Gardens and floral exhibits
 Hogg Exhibits of trees
 Knightian Exhibits of vegetables, including herbs
 Lindley Exhibits of special educational or scientific interest
 Grenfell Exhibits of pictures, photographs, floral arrangements and floristry

Special awards
 Best Show Garden Award
 Best Courtyard Garden Award
 Best Chic Garden Award
 Best City Garden Award
 RHS Sundries Bowl
 RHS Junior Display Trophy
 RHS Floral Arrangement Trophies
 RHS Floristry Trophies
 Show Certificates of Merit
 Certificates for Junior Displays
 RHS President's Award
 RHS Best Tradestand Award
 RHS Director General's Award for the Best Tradestand

Significant gardens and exhibits
1929 Mrs Sherman Hoyt's exhibit of American cacti, complete with painted backdrops depicting the Mojave desert, which was acquired for Kew and had its own glasshouse there for over half a century, before being absorbed into the Princess of Wales Conservatory
1930s J. Macdonald's grass gardens – the lone voice declaring the merits of ornamental grasses for his generation
1936 Hilliers' 'Dingley Dell' exhibit
1937 Coronation Year: the Empire Exhibition, with displays of ornamental and economic plants from around the Empire
1953 Another Coronation Year: William Wood of Taplow staged a 'Cutty Sark' garden
1959 The Times 'Garden of Tomorrow', complete with radio-controlled lawn mower
1960 The great orchid display to accompany the Third World Orchid Conference
1964 Popular Gardening'''s 'Garden of Today'
1967 The first garden for the disabled at Chelsea
1968 Wisley's exhibit of hostas, which gave a great boost to their popularity
1980 Display of penjing from China
1982 Brenda Hyatt's display of auriculas, which launched these plants back into popularity
1988 John Chambers's honeybee garden. This was the last year the Wilkinson Sword for Best Show Garden was awarded.
1991 The RHS reinstated the Best Show Garden Award in conjunction with Fiskars (who were the owners of the Wilkinson brand and were relaunching the brand Fiskars). The new award was the Sword of Excellence and was presented by the RHS President to the Daily Express Garden ‘The Forgotten Pavilion’ designed by John Van Hage, who became the youngest ever designer to win a RHS Gold medal at Chelsea.
1993 Julie Toll's seaside garden controversially won the short lived Fiskars Sword of Excellence for best show garden, described by David Stevens as "a sand dune garden that was well planted and beautiful, but visitors said it wasn't a garden."
1994 Isabel and Julian Bannerman's Daily Telegraph Old Abbey garden with a virtuoso display of mature tree transplanting. The Sunday Express Railway Garden by Julian Dowle was a very popular themed garden featuring Railway artefacts, wild flowers, a vegetable plot and a beautiful colourful display of cottage plants.
1996 Dan Pearson's London roof garden for the 1990s
1997 Christopher Bradley-Hole's Latin Garden, the first garden at Chelsea to exhibit the new fashion for sparse planting
2000 The Garden History Society's Le Nôtre Garden, and Piet Oudolf's winning 'Evolution' garden
2002 Mary Reynolds became the youngest garden designer to win a gold medal at the show
2004 Tourism New Zealand presented the first authentic thermal New Zealand garden entitled "Ora Garden of Well-being" winning a Gold Medal.
2009 James May's Paradise in Plasticine, a garden made entirely of Plasticine. Its concept and creation was documented for James May's Toy Stories.
2010 Kebony Naturally Norway Garden designed by Darren Saines. It was the first time Norway was represented in Chelsea Flower Show with a big show garden. Row after row of exotic orchids from Taiwan, presented by the Taiwan Orchid Growers Association (TOGA). This was the first time that Taiwan was invited to the Chelsea Flower Show.News in Taiwan Today on 26 May 2010
2011 Diarmuid Gavin's Irish Sky Garden. This was the first garden to be suspended in the air.
2016 A display of 300,000 individually crocheted poppies, covering nearly 2,000sq m, designed by Phillip Johnson and made by over 50,000 contributors.
2022 The Queen's Platinum Jubilee Garden. Laser-cut steel silhouettes of the Queen were featured, surrounded by 70 planted terracotta pots planted with Lily of the Valley, the Queen's favourite flower.Chelsea Flower Show to mark Platinum Jubilee with sculpture of Queen’s postage stamp silhouette

See also

 Chelsea Fringe
 Tatton Park Flower Show
 Hampton Court Palace Flower Show
 Garden festival
 Cultural icon
 List of cultural icons of England

References

External links
 RHS Chelsea Flower Show official site
 Hampton Court Palace Flower Show official site
 Coverage from the BBC Coverage from The Guardian Coverage from The Daily Telegraph''

1862 establishments in England
Annual events in London
Gardening in England
Flower shows
Parks and open spaces in the Royal Borough of Kensington and Chelsea
Recurring events established in 1862
Chelsea, London
Royal Horticultural Society